Adam McCullock (born 1834) was a Union Navy sailor in the American Civil War and a recipient of the U.S. military's highest decoration, the Medal of Honor, for his actions at the Battle of Mobile Bay.

Born in 1834 in Maine, McCullock was living in Augusta when he joined the Navy. He refused an order to go below decks and instead remained at his post throughout the battle. For this action, he was awarded the Medal of Honor four months later, on December 31, 1864.

McCullock's official Medal of Honor citation reads:
On board the U.S.S. Lackawanna during successful attacks against Fort Morgan, rebel gunboats and the ram Tennessee in Mobile Bay, on 5 August 1864. Wounded when an enemy shell struck, and ordered to go below, McCullock refused to leave his station and continued to perform his duties throughout the prolonged action which resulted in the capture of the prize ram Tennessee and in the damaging and destruction of Fort Morgan.

References 

1830s births
Year of death unknown
People from Augusta, Maine
People of Maine in the American Civil War
Union Navy sailors
United States Navy Medal of Honor recipients
American Civil War recipients of the Medal of Honor